Smritirekha Biswas (Commonly known as Smriti Biswas) is an Indian actress.

Career
She has worked in many Hindi, Marathi and Bengali movies. Biswas started her career as a child artist. She worked in the films of Guru Dutt, V Shantaram, Mrinal Sen, Bimal Roy, BR Chopra, and Raj Kapoor. She acted with Dev Anand, Kishore Kumar and other notable artist. Biswas retired from the acting after marrying film director S.D Narang in 1960. Presently she is living a life of poverty in Nashik. Smriti has two sons, Rajeev and Satyajeet.

Filmography
 Sandhya (1944)
 Udayer Pathey (1944)
 Ragini (1947)
 Nek Dil
 Kaise Bhulu
 Mukti
 Chitgaon
 Aparajita
 Abhimaan
 Anurag
 Jaban Bandi
 Suhan
 Aaraju
 Hamsafar
 Hamdard
 Baap Re Baap
 Bhagam Bhag (1956)
 Daaka
 Maryada
 Taj
 Talwar
 Shaheed-E-Azad Bhagat Singh (1954)
 Modern Girl
 Ek Aurat
 Nai Bhabhi
 Arab Ka Saudagar
 Yahudi Ki Ladki (1957 film)
 Dilli Ka Thug
 Chandni Chowk (film)
 Neel Akasher Neechey

External links

References

Living people
Actresses in Hindi cinema
Indian film actresses
Actresses from Kolkata
21st-century Indian actresses
Year of birth missing (living people)